Sanila is the first town to enter Tehsil Puran District Shangla in the Khyber Pakhtunkhwa Province of Pakistan. Most of the town's inhabitants belong to the Barat Khel branch of the subtribe Babozai of the major Yusufzai Pashtun tribe. Khurshaid Khan and Ameer siyab khan Ex PMLN leaders belongs to Sanila Village.Manzoor Ahmad is Chairman of VC sanila Bar puran While Dr Ghafoor Ahmad khan Former DHO shangla is serving as MS SPMK THQ Hospital Puran Shangla.

External links 

http://www.puran.20m.com

Cities and towns in Shangla District